Sandip Basu is an Indian physician of Nuclear Medicine and the Head, Nuclear Medicine Academic Program at the Radiation Medicine Centre (Bhabha Atomic Research Centre). He is also the Dean-Academic (Health-Sciences), BARC at Homi Bhabha National Institute and is known for his services and research in Nuclear Medicine, particularly on Positron emission tomography diagnostics and Targeted Radionuclide Therapy in Cancer. The Council of Scientific and Industrial Research, the apex agency of the Government of India for scientific research, awarded him the Shanti Swarup Bhatnagar Prize for Science and Technology, one of the highest Indian science awards for his contributions to Nuclear Medicine in 2012.

Biography 

Sandip Basu, is a Professor of Nuclear Medicine at the Radiation Medicine Centre, and Head, Nuclear Medicine Academic Programme, affiliated to the Health Sciences, BARC. He also serves as the dean-academics (Health Sciences), BARC  at Homi Bhabha National Institute of the Department of Atomic Energy. He pursues his clinical patient services, academics and research interests  at the Radiation Medicine Centre Bhabha Atomic Research Centre housed at Tata Memorial Hospital Annexe Building at Parel, Mumbai. He is known for his clinical and applied research in the field of Nuclear Medicine, especially on positron emission tomography-based diagnostics and Targeted Radionuclide therapy. One major area of his research interests and clinical work has been the integration of functional radionuclide imaging and targeted radionuclide treatment which assisted in developing personalized management model and providing individualized treatment to patients of cancer. His studies have been documented by way of a number of articles of which many have been listed by online article repositories such as Google Scholar and ResearchGate. Besides, he has guest-edited six books viz. Breast Cancer Imaging I: Number 3, Breast Cancer Imaging II: Pet Clinics, Radiation Therapy Planning with PET: Number 2, Modern Quantitative Techniques for PET, PET Imaging of Brain Tumors, An Issue of PET Clinics and PET-Based Molecular Imaging in Evolving Personalized Management Design, An Issue of PET Clinics and has contributed chapters to books published by others.

Basu served as the national project coordinator of the IAEA-Regional Co-operative Agreement project at Bhabha Atomic Energy Centre on Strengthening the Applications of Nuclear Medicine in the Management of Cardiovascular Diseases. He serves as a member of the editorial boards of a number of journals including European Journal of Nuclear Medicine and Molecular Imaging, Nuclear Medicine Communications and Hellenic journal of Nuclear Medicine. He is also a former editor of World Journal of Radiology. He has been an author of more than 400 peer-reviewed papers and delivered several invited speeches in national/international conferences and symposiums.

In his capacity as the Dean-Academics, Medical and Health Sciences, BARC, Dr Basu took pivotal role in initiating the M.D. (Nuclear Medicine) course for doctors and the M.Sc.(Nuclear Medicine and Molecular Imaging Technology) and M.Sc. (Hospital Radiopharmacy) courses for science graduates, at the Radiation Medicine Centre (BARC) under the aegis of HBNI University, aimed at developing trained manpower in the field of Nuclear Medicine. The M.Sc. (Hospital Radiopharmacy) course at the Centre was first of its kind in India, providing structured training in the subject.

Between 2010 and 2020, Dr. Basu was instrumental in developing a large-volume clinical PRRT service in the centre by the joint efforts of Radiation Medicine Centre (RMC), Bhabha Atomic Research Centre (BARC), and Tata Memorial Hospital (TMH) at the TMH-RMC premises, delivering over 4,000 [177Lu]Lu-DOTATATE therapies for patients with metastatic/advanced neuroendocrine neoplasms and related malignancies making this the largest PRRT set-up in the country, an exemplar of successful PRRT programme employing indigenous 177Lutetium production at BARC and resources. Since 2017, he steered the development of [68Ga]Ga-/[177Lu]Lu-PSMA-based theranostics and peptide receptor radioligand therapy (PRLT) in metastatic castration resistant prostate carcinoma (mCRPC) patients in the centre.

Awards and honors 
The Society of Nuclear Medicine and Molecular Imaging selected him for the Alavi-Mandell Award in 2010. The Council of Scientific and Industrial Research awarded Basu the Shanti Swarup Bhatnagar Prize, one of the highest Indian science awards in 2012. 
Dr. Basu was recipient of the DAE Homi Bhabha Science and Technology Award 2017 and the Homi Bhabha Memorial Oration 2019 at the 51st Annual Meeting of the Society of Nuclear Medicine India.

Selected bibliography

Books

Articles 
 
 

Basu S, Houseni M, Bural G, Chamroonat W, Udupa J, Mishra S, Alavi A. "Magnetic resonance imaging based bone marrow segmentation for quantitative calculation of pure red marrow metabolism using 2-deoxy-2-[F-18]fluoro-D-glucose-positron emission tomography: a novel application with significant implications for combined structure-function approach. Mol Imaging Biol. 2007 Nov-Dec;9(6):361-5.

 Basu S, Zaidi H, Houseni M, Bural G, Udupa J, Acton P, Torigian DA, Alavi A.Novel quantitative techniques for assessing regional and global function and structure based on modern imaging modalities: implications for normal variation, aging and diseased states. Semin Nucl Med. 2007 May;37(3):223-39

Basu S, Parghane RV. "Designing and Developing PET-Based Precision Model in Thyroid Carcinoma: The Potential Avenues for a Personalized Clinical Care. PET Clin. 2017 Jan;12(1):27-37.

See also 

 Medical imaging
 Radiopharmaceuticals
 Fludeoxyglucose (18F)
 Standardized uptake value

Notes

References 

1971 births
Medical doctors from Mumbai
Indian medical writers
Indian nuclear medicine physicians
Recipients of the Shanti Swarup Bhatnagar Award in Medical Science
Living people
21st-century Indian medical doctors